The 2002 World Ladies Snooker Championship was a women's snooker tournament. It was the 2002 edition of the World Women's Snooker Championship, first held in 1976.

The tournament was won by Kelly Fisher, who retained the title by defeating Lisa Quick 4–1 in the final. This was Fisher's fourth world title. The rounds before the semi-final were played at Jesters snooker club, Swindon, and the semi-finals and final were played at the Crucible Theatre.

Main Draw

References 

2002 in English sport
2002 in snooker
2002 in women's sport
April 2002 sports events in the United Kingdom
International sports competitions hosted by England
2002